Petar Musa (born 4 March 1998) is a Croatian professional footballer who plays as a forward for Portuguese club Benfica and the Croatia national team.

Club career

Early career
Born in Zagreb, Musa started playing football in the Hrvatski Dragovoljac youth system, before joining NK Zagreb in 2007. He made his first team debut on 1 March 2016 in the Prva HNL in a 3–0 away loss to Slaven Belupo. Musa eventually made six appearances for his team, as they were relegated to the 2. HNL.

Slavia Prague
Musa was signed by Slavia Prague in 2017, but he was immediately loaned out to Viktoria Žižkov in the Czech National Football League. He scored 12 goals in 37 games on loan, but during the winter transfer window, he was loaned to Slovan Liberec in February 2019, making his debut in the Czech First League on 16 February in a 2–1 away loss against Baník Ostrava. 

During the first half of 2019–20, Musa began displaying an impressive goalscoring form, scoring seven goals for his team, including a brace against Mladá Boleslav on 27 October, which led Slavia Prague to recall him from his loan and integrating him into the club's first team. In the league season, Musa scored Slavia's goal in the 1–1 draw to rivals Sparta Prague in the Prague derby, the winning goal in a 1–0 away victory over 1. FK Příbram, netted a brace in the 4–0 home victory over FK Jablonec. He finished the season as the league's top scorer alongside Libor Kozák, with 14 goals. In doing so, he became the youngest ever player (aged 22 years and 122 days) to achieve that feat.

Despite being scouted by a number of established European teams, Musa decided to stay in Prague for another season in order to continue his development. However, he fell into a scoring drought and was loaned for the remainder of the season to German Bundesliga side 1. FC Union Berlin on 1 February 2021, at the last day of the 2020–21 winter transfer window. The loan fee paid to Slavia Prague was reported as €200,000 by sports magazine Kicker. On 17 April, he scored his first Bundesliga goal in a 2–1 home victory over VfB Stuttgart, but he added no more goals in 14 games for the rest of the season.

Instead of returning to Slavia Prague, Musa was sent on a season-long loan to Portuguese Primeira Liga side Boavista on 25 August 2021, with an option to buy. He scored 12 goals and proving four assists, helping his side to a 12th place finish, as Boavista triggered Musa's buyout clause of €3.5 million.

Benfica
On 20 May 2022, Musa signed a five-year contract with Benfica of the same league, for a fee of €5 million, plus half of Ricardo Mangas' economic rights and Ilija Vukotić being sent to Boavista in part-exchange for €500,000 of half of his economic rights  bringing the net cost of the transaction to €4.5 million. 

He made his debut for the club on 23 August, replacing Gonçalo Ramos in the 52nd minute in the 3–0 home win over Dynamo Kyiv in the second leg of the 2022–23 UEFA Champions League play-off round, helping his side qualify to the tournament. Four days later, Musa made his league debut, against his former side Boavista, providing an assist and managed to win a penalty for his side after being fouled inside the box, which was subsequently converted by João Mário in a 3–0 win. He scored his first goal on 8 October, closing a 4–2 home win over Rio Ave. On 15 October, Musa scored the opener in a 1–1 draw to Liga 3 side Caldas in the third round of the Taça de Portugal, which Benfica went on to win 6–4 in a penalty shoot-out, after extra-time. On 2 November, he scored his first UEFA Champions League goal in a 6–1 away win against Maccabi Haifa in their last 2022–23 UEFA Champions League group stage match, to ensure Benfica's qualification to the round of sixteen, as group winners.

International career
Musa began his international career with under-18 level in 2015, for a total of 3 caps. On 14 November 2019, Musa won his first cap for the under-21 side in a 3–1 victory in Lithuania for the 2021 European Championship qualification campaign. In March 2021, Musa took part in the 2021 UEFA European Under-21 Championship, helping Croatia to a quarter-final finish, after losing 2–1 to Spain in extra-time.

He was called up to the senior side by manager Zlatko Dalić on 16 May 2022, for the 2022–23 UEFA Nations League matches against Austria, France and Denmark.

Career statistics

Club

Honours
Slavia Prague
 Czech First League: 2019–20, 2020–21
 Czech Cup: 2020–21
Individual
Czech First League Top Scorer: 2019–20
Czech First League Forward of the Year: 2019–20

References

External links
 Profile at the S.L. Benfica website
 
 

1998 births
Living people
Footballers from Zagreb
Association football forwards
Croatian footballers
Croatia youth international footballers
Croatia under-21 international footballers
NK Zagreb players
NK Inter Zaprešić players
SK Slavia Prague players
FK Viktoria Žižkov players
FC Slovan Liberec players
1. FC Union Berlin players
Boavista F.C. players
S.L. Benfica footballers
Croatian Football League players
First Football League (Croatia) players
Czech National Football League players
Czech First League players
Bundesliga players
Primeira Liga players
Croatian expatriate footballers
Expatriate footballers in the Czech Republic
Croatian expatriate sportspeople in the Czech Republic
Expatriate footballers in Germany
Croatian expatriate sportspeople in Germany
Expatriate footballers in Portugal
Croatian expatriate sportspeople in Portugal